Route 179 is a  state highway in the U.S. state of Rhode Island. Route 179 is a short connector between Route  77 and Route 81 which are the two main roads in Tiverton and Little Compton. The Eastern terminus of Route 179 also serves as the southern terminus for Route 81.

Route description 

Route 179 begins at an intersection with Route 77 (Main Road) in the Nonquit Pond area of Tiverton, Rhode Island. Route 179 progresses eastward as East Road through a residential neighborhood until the intersection with Eight Rod Way, where the alignment shifts to the southeast. Curving in several directions, Route 179 enters a busier neighborhood at the intersection with Lake Road. Just after Lake Road, the designation changes alignments at a fork, becoming part of Stone Church Road, instead of East Road, which continues straight towards Route 81. Route 179 turns to the southeast, passing homes and a large field before entering the neighborhood of Adamsville. At the intersection with Colebrook Road in Adamsville, Route 179 turns eastward and changes names once againm this time to Main Street. Passing a short residential stretch, Route 179 intersects with Route 81 (Crandall Road), where both Route 179 and Route 81 terminate. Main Street continues eastward a short distance to the Massachusetts state line.

Major intersections

See also 

Route 177 (Rhode Island – Massachusetts)

References

External links
2019 Highway Map, Rhode Island

179
Transportation in Newport County, Rhode Island